Georg Heinrich Willem (Wim) Thoelke (9 May 1927 – 26 November 1995) was a German TV entertainer.

Wim Thoelke worked during the 1960s and 1970s for TV sport serie das aktuelle sportstudio on German channel ZDF.
Thoelke was born in Mülheim an der Ruhr. He was married and had two children.

Awards 
 1970: Bambi Award

Literature 
 Wim Thoelke: Stars, Kollegen und Ganoven – eine Art Autobiographie. Lübbe, Bergisch Gladbach 1995,

External links 
 Wim Thoelke in German National Library

German sports journalists
German sports broadcasters
German game show hosts
German male journalists
20th-century German journalists
1927 births
1995 deaths
People from Mülheim
ZDF people
ZDF heute presenters and reporters